The Iranian Business School (IBS) (Persian: , Musish-e Âmvâzesh-e 'ali-ye Iranian) is an international business school located in Tehran, Iran. The Iranian Business School (IBS) is a not-for-profit post-graduate School accredited by The Ministry of Science, Research and Technology of Iran and works in partnership management education institutions in the world to offer business and management studies in Iran.

History

The Iranian Business School was conceived of in 2007 by a core group of philanthropists from the business community of the Iranian diaspora and supported by leading private sector figures within Iran. IBS introduce the Aalto EMBA in cooperation with Aalto University, Finland in January 2014.

See also
Higher education in Iran
Education in Iran

References

External links 
 Iranian Business School Official website

Educational institutions established in 2010
2010 establishments in Iran
Business schools in Tehran